Rock N' Road is a 2014 Taiwanese romantic musical comedy television series created and produced by TVBS. It stars Chris Wu, Kimi Hsia, Mike Lee and Nita Lei. The original title literally translates to "A-List Road", which is in reference to the billing status of a celebrity. Filming began on 7 February 2014 and wrapped up on 19 June 2014, the drama was filmed as it aired. First original broadcast began on 16 March 2014 on CTS airing every Sunday night at 10:00-11:30 pm and then 22 March 2014 on TVBS airing every Saturday night at 9:00-10:30 pm. Final episode aired on 6 July 2014 with 16 episodes total.

Synopsis
Lin Wei Zhen was a former teen singing sensation, but found herself upstaged by Zhou Shu Yu and his band during a New Year's performance in 2006 because she arrived late to the show. Since then her fame and career has diminish. she now finds herself going from amateur auditions to auditions trying to break back into the music industry again. Zhou Shu Yu has since become one of the most successful and sought after music producers and songwriters in Asia. His longtime girlfriend Yang Jia Xin is also a popular singer and songwriters, but when Jia Xin falls into a creative slump she steals a song written by Wei Zhen's late father and passes it off as her own. Shu Yu finds out about Jia Xin plagiarizing Wei Zhen's song and sides with Wei Zhen. Unhappy that Shu Yu does not support her in her success with the new song she and Shu Yu's former bandmate and now manager Xu Da Li, both turn against Shu Yu causing him to lose everything he has worked so hard for. With only Wei Zhen by his side, Shu Yu helps her become the A-Lister she so highly sought after to become.

Cast

Main cast
Chris Wu as Zhou Shu Yu 周書宇
Kimi Hsia as Lin Wei Zhen 林維真
 as Xu Da Li 徐立達
 as Yang Jia Xin 楊佳欣

Supporting cast

Mami Gu 古欣玉 as Lai Qian Nei 賴千芮
Bernice Wang 王寶第 as Ivy
Simon Twu 涂世旻 as Wang Mu Qun 王牧群
Jeanine Yang 楊晴 as Zhuang Qiao Ru 莊巧如
Chin Shih-chieh 金士傑 as Ge Zhong Ming 葛仲明
Wang Chuan 王琄 as Li Mei Nu 李美女
Allison Lin 林予晞 as Guan Guan 關關
Ji Jun Wei 紀峻崴 as Ah Song 阿松
Ma Nien Hsien 馬念先 as Ma Ding Ni 馬丁尼
Zhang Pei Hua 張佩華 as Lai Du Cheng 賴篤成
Grace Ko 葛蕾 as Zheng Shu Hua 鄭淑華
Dong Ye 東野 as Ah Xiu 阿修
Ann An 安思瑋 as Ann
Chris Downs 夏克立 as Mei Da Duo 梅大鐸
Cathy Chung 鍾欣怡 as young Bai Hui Lan 少年白蕙蘭

Guest role

Coco Lee 李玟 as herself 
Della Ding Dang 丁噹 as herself
Yen-J 嚴爵 as himself 
Daniel Luo 羅時豐 as Taxi driver 
Cai Ming Xiu 蔡明修 as County Chief 
Joseph Ma 馬國賢 as himself 
Liu Xiang Jun 劉香君 as Shop owner 
Yao Hung 洪敬堯 as himself
Jesse Tang as herself 
Roger Wang 王中平 as Lin Yu Liang 
Jacko Chiang 蔣偉文 as TV show host 
Chung Hsin-yu as herself 
Linda Chien 簡愷樂 as Kai Lok 
Jia Jia 家家 as herself 
Plungon 浩角翔起 as themselves 
Snow Liao 廖盈婷 as News anchor 
Fan Shi Xuan 范時軒 as TV show host 
Chu Chung Heng 屈中恆 as Paul Lan
Michael Zhang 張勛傑 as Aaron

Soundtrack
You're the One and Only 你是唯一 by Mayday 五月天
Happiness Coming 快樂快了 by Jia Jia 家家
Heartbroken People Should Not Listen to Slow Songs 傷心的人別聽慢歌 by Mayday 五月天
Onion 洋蔥 by Mayday 五月天
Rolling Cart 軋車 by Mayday 五月天
Loving to Wash Shrimps 愛洗蝦米 by Won Fu 旺福
Backpackers 背包客 by Won Fu 旺福
Salary Man's Diary 小職員日記 by Won Fu 旺福
Singing for Lonely Souls 為你的寂寞唱歌 by Jia Jia 家家
Pajama Party 睡衣Party by Jia Jia 家家 
Chocolate 巧克力 by Jia Jia 家家
Friends 朋友 by Chris Wu 吳慷仁 & Kimi Hsia 夏于喬
Gold Rush Years 淘金歲月 by Plungon 浩角翔起
Get Rid of It 甩開 by Della Ding Dang 丁噹
In the Spring 春天裡 by Della Ding Dang 丁噹
To Insist 堅持 by Chris Wu 吳慷仁

Broadcast

Episode ratings

References

External links
Rock N' Road TVBS Website  
Rock N' Road CTS Website 

2014 Taiwanese television series debuts
2014 Taiwanese television series endings
Taiwanese romance television series
Chinese Television System original programming
TVBS original programming